The 2008 United States presidential election in Ohio took place on November 4, 2008, which was part of the 2008 United States presidential election. Voters chose 20 representatives, or electors to the Electoral College, who voted for president and vice president.

Ohio was won by Democratic nominee Barack Obama with a 4.59% margin of victory. Prior to the election, most news organizations considered this state as a major swing state and bellwether. Both major party candidates visited the Buckeye State numerous times and campaigned throughout the state extensively trying to sway moderates and independent voters to their side. The polls in Ohio were fairly even throughout the campaign but Obama had a slight lead as Election Day drew closer. In the end, Obama flipped Ohio into the Democratic column. Obama's 2,940,044 votes is the most received by a Democratic presidential candidate in the state's history. Despite this fact, Obama became the first Democrat ever to win the White House without carrying Pike County, and the first Democrat to win the White House without carrying Lawrence County since John F. Kennedy in 1960.

Primaries
 2008 Ohio Republican presidential primary
 2008 Ohio Democratic presidential primary

Campaign

Predictions
There were 16 news organizations who made state-by-state predictions of the election. Here are their last predictions before election day:

Polling

During most of the summer and September, McCain led many state polls and many by 50% of over. Rasmussen had McCain leading with as high as 51% in September. But many voters in the state changed their minds as Obama later gained a steady lead in most polls taken starting in the beginning of October (around the time of the 2008 financial crisis).

Fundraising
Obama raised $7,218,801. McCain raised $5,682,839.

Advertising and visits
A major swing state, Obama spent over $28 million to McCain's $24 million. The Republican ticket visited the state 28 times to the Obama ticket's 22 times.

Analysis
Going into Election 2008, both McCain and Obama knew that Ohio was a crucial state. Earlier in the primary season, Ohio had given a major comeback victory to Hillary Clinton.  Both candidates campaigned heavily throughout the state in hopes for winning its 20 electoral votes. As no Republican has ever won the presidency without winning Ohio, it was seen in particular as a "must-win" state for McCain. George W. Bush's narrow wins in 2000 (by 3.50% against Al Gore) and 2004 (2.11% against John Kerry) proved critical in Bush's narrow wins nationally.

On Election Day 2008, Obama won the Buckeye State's 20 electoral votes by a margin of 4.59%. Obama's win in heavily populated areas such as Cuyahoga County (Cleveland), Franklin County (Columbus), Lucas County (Toledo), Montgomery County (Dayton), Summit County (Akron), Stark County (Canton), Mahoning County (Youngstown) and the traditionally Republican Hamilton County (Cincinnati) greatly contributed to his victory in the state.

McCain did best in the Republican base in the center and western regions, composed of relatively rural areas combined with Cincinnati and Columbus' heavily Republican suburbs. In addition, McCain won all but four counties in the Appalachian southeast, mirroring the troubles Obama had throughout this region. On the other hand, Obama did best in the Democratic base—Cleveland (where he won almost 70% of the vote), Youngstown and the heavily unionized counties next to Pennsylvania.  However, he was unable to significantly improve upon John Kerry's performance in these areas. More surprisingly, the cities of Cincinnati and Columbus gave him strong support. Cincinnati, the only major city that didn't vote for Franklin D. Roosevelt, voted Democratic for the first time since 1964. Columbus, a city shifting to the Democrats, also voted for Obama by a three-to-two margin. In addition, Obama won several northern counties along the shore of Lake Erie that John Kerry had lost in 2004.

As polls closed and results were coming in on Election Night, Republican strategist and adviser Karl Rove joined Brit Hume on Fox News offering analysis. Rove was discussing the impact an Ohio loss would have on McCain's chances of winning the election.  "If he loses Ohio," Rove stated of McCain, "he goes from 286, which the Republicans carried in 2004, down to 266, and that puts him below the 270 threshold needed to win the White House. So he'd not only need to sweep the rest of these states which were won by the Republicans in 2004, he'd also need to pick up something as well." In an untimely moment, Hume broke in.  "Guess what Karl," Hume interrupted, "I've just received word that the state of Ohio has gone for Barack Obama."

This marked the first time since 1952 that Ohio voted for a different candidate than neighboring Kentucky,  as well as the first time ever that Ohio voted Democratic while Kentucky voted Republican. , this is the last election in which Lake County, Monroe County, Belmont County, Tuscarawas County, and Jefferson County voted for a Democratic Presidential candidate.

Results

Results by county

 ''

Counties that flipped from Republican to Democratic 
 Hamilton (largest municipality: Cincinnati)
 Lake (largest municipality: Mentor)
 Ottawa (largest municipality: Port Clinton)
 Sandusky (largest municipality: Fremont)
 Tuscarawas (largest municipality: New Philadelphia)
 Wood (largest municipality: Bowling Green)

By congressional district
Although Barack Obama won the state, John McCain carried 10 of the state’s 18 congressional districts, including three districts that simultaneously elected a Democrat. Obama carried 8 districts, including one district held by a Republican.

Electors

Technically the voters of Ohio cast their ballots for electors: representatives to the Electoral College. Ohio is allocated 20 electors because it has 18 congressional districts and 2 senators. All candidates who appear on the ballot or qualify to receive write-in votes must submit a list of 20 electors, who pledge to vote for their candidate and their running mate. Whoever wins the majority of votes in the state is awarded all 20 electoral votes. Their chosen electors then vote for president and vice president. Although electors are pledged to their candidate and running mate, they are not obligated to vote for them. An elector who votes for someone other than their candidate is known as a faithless elector.

The electors of each state and the District of Columbia met on December 15, 2008, to cast their votes for president and vice president. The Electoral College itself never meets as one body. Instead the electors from each state and the District of Columbia met in their respective capitols.

The following were the members of the Electoral College from the state. All 20 were pledged to Barack Obama and Joe Biden:
Catherine Barrett
Barbara Tuckerman
Wade Kapszukiewicz
Tamela Lee
Renee Cafaro
Victoria Wulsin
Craig Brown
Jimmy Cotner
Janet Carson
Bruce Johnson
Nannette Whaley
Martha Jane Brooks
Eugene Miller
Fran Alberty
Chris Redfern
John Kosty
Kelly Gillis
Charleta Tavares
Michael Todd
Ted Strickland

See also
 United States presidential elections in Ohio
 Presidency of Barack Obama

References

Ohio
2008
2008 Ohio elections